Kalavani Mappillai is a 2018 Tamil-language comedy film, directed by Gandhi Manivasagam. Featuring Attakathi Dinesh and 
Adhiti Menon in leading role, The film production began on 15 February 2018 and was released on 6 November 2018 with mixed reviews.

Plot 
The film involves a childhood rivalry between Deva and Villangam, a hastily built romance between Deva and Thulasi, a back story for why Thulasi's mother Rajeswari wants a son-in-law who can drive, a henpecked husband, and a comic character Vanagamoodi who could expose Deva's lies.

Cast

Dinesh as Deva 
Adhiti Menon as Thulasi 
Anandaraj as Thulasi's father
Devayani as Rajeswari
Ramdoss as Villangam
Rajendran as Vanagamoodi 
Chaams as Stepni
Manobala
Renuka
Crane Manohar
Lallu

Production
The film shooting began on 15 January 2018 in Pollachi.

References

External links
 

2018 films
2010s Tamil-language films
Indian comedy films
2018 comedy films